B. H. Dunuwille (1896 -  )  was a Ceylonese legislator. He was a member Senate of Ceylon and served as its Deputy President (1947–70).

He was educated at Trinity College, Kandy and he became a proctor. His son Harindra Dunuwille, was the  Mayor of Kandy, a Member of Parliament and State Minister of State for Constitutional Affairs. His brother-in law E. L. B. Hurulle was a Member of Parliament, Government Minister, Governor Central Province.

See also
List of political families in Sri Lanka

External links & References

Members of the Senate of Ceylon
Sri Lankan Buddhists
Sinhalese politicians
Alumni of Trinity College, Kandy
Ceylonese proctors